The 1946 Texas Longhorns football team was an American football team that represented the University of Texas in the Southwest Conference (SWC) during the 1946 college football season. In their tenth and final year under head coach Dana X. Bible, the Longhorns compiled an 8–2 record (4–2 against SWC opponenets) and outscored all opponents by a total of 290 to 68. Texas was ranked No. 1 in the first AP Poll of the 1946 season, but slid throughout the season and was ranked No. 15 in the final poll.

The Longhorns ranked 15th nationally in total offense with an average of 328.1 yards per game, and 10th nationally in total defense with 176.0 yards allowed per game. Led by Bobby Layne, they ranked third nationally in passing offense with 156.9 yards per game. Layne ranked second nationally in total offense with 1,460 yards (1,122 passing and 336 rushing) and second nationally in passing yardage.

Five Texas players received honors from the Associated Press (AP) or United Press (UP) on the 1946 All-Southwest Conference football team: Bobby Layne (AP-1, UP-1); center Dick Harris (AP-1, UP-1); back Jim Canady (AP-2, UP-2); end Hub Bechtol (AP-2, UP-2); and guard Spot Collins (AP-2, UP-2).

Schedule

Awards and honors
Hub Bechtol, End, Consensus All-American

After the season

The 1947 NFL Draft was held on December 16, 1946. The following Longhorns were selected.

References

Texas
Texas Longhorns football seasons
Texas Longhorns football